Shawnee Heights High School is a fully accredited public high school located in Tecumseh, Kansas, east of Topeka, Kansas. The school colors are red, white and turquoise and the school mascot is the Thunderbird. The average annual enrollment is approximately 1,200 students.

Shawnee Heights is a member of the Kansas State High School Activities Association and offers a variety of sports programs. Athletic teams compete in the 5A division and are known as the "Thunderbirds". Extracurricular activities are also offered in the form of performing arts, school publications, and clubs. The school is a member of the United Kansas Conference.

History

Extracurricular activities
The Thunderbirds compete in the United Kansas Conference and are classified as a Class 5A school, the second-largest classification in Kansas according to the Kansas State High School Activities Association. Throughout its history, Shawnee Heights has won numerous state championships. Many graduates have gone on to participate in collegiate athletics.

Athletics

Baseball
Shawnee Heights has experienced a large amount of success throughout its history. The program has made numerous trips to the Kansas State Baseball Tournament, winning the state championship four times, occurring in 1994, 1999, 2001, 2011. In the 2010–2011 season they managed to go 25–0, in large part because of their 11 seniors.

Basketball
The Shawnee Heights boys' basketball program was one of the top programs in the state in the 1980s, 1990s, and early 2000s. During that span, the team won four state championships, occurring in 1988, 1989, 2000, and 2002, adding an additional championship in 2017. The Thunderbirds also won several Centennial League titles. The girls' programs has also won state championships in 1977 and 1986.

Softball
Shawnee Heights has a rich history of softball excellence.  This was never more evident than in the 2017 season, in which the Lady T-Birds were undefeated in the regular season and postseason.  They capped off a perfect 24–0 season by capturing the 5A State Championship.  Shawnee Heights turned in one of the most dominating performances ever seen in the state softball tournament, as they outscored their opponents by a total of 30–2 over the 3 games.

Track & Field
Shawnee Heights perennially has one of the strongest track and field programs in the state for both boys and girls. The boys' program has won state championships in 1989, 2007, and 2015. The 1989 team was led by future All-American Marcel Carter. Carter became the first male athlete in Kansas history to win four consecutive state championships in the 200m dash, winning from 1986 to 1989. The girls' program won state championships in 1974, 1993, and 2009. The most notable female track and field athlete is Trisa Nickoley who attended the school from 2000 to 2004. In track, she won the state championship in three individual events all four years – 400m (56.10), 800m (2:06.67) and 1600m (5:04.71). She was also state champion in the 4 × 400 m relay. She earned Track & Field News All-American recognition during her final two years and was named the Gatorade Track & Field Athlete of the Year three times.

State championships

Shawnee Heights High School offers the following sports:

Fall
 Football
 Volleyball
 Cross-Country
 Girls' Golf
 Boys' Soccer
 Girls' Tennis
 Cheerleading
 Dance Team (Thunderetts)

Winter
 Basketball
 Wrestling
 Bowling
 Dance Team
 Winter Cheerleading
 Boys' Swimming/Diving

Spring
 Baseball
 Boys' Golf
 Boys' Tennis
 Girls' Soccer
 Girls' Swimming/Diving
 Softball
 Track and Field

Construction project
In the summer of 2006 the school received a remodeling and a new construction project after the passage of a bond issue in 2005. This project was completed in the summer of 2007.

This project enclosed the walkway once separating the 9-10 building (now the North Wing) and the 11-12 building (now the South Wing).

Notable alumni
 Corey Ballentine, professional American football cornerback for the New York Giants
 Tom Dinkel, former professional American football linebacker in the National Football League for the Cincinnati Bengals (1978–1985)
Wyatt Hubert, former football player at Kansas State and now with the Cincinnati Bengals
 Mitch McVicker, Christian musician
 Brad Parscale, campaign manager for Donald Trump's 2020 election campaign and digital media director for Donald Trump's 2016 election campaign
 Troy Wilson, NFL professional football player, member of the 1994 San Francisco 49ers Super Bowl championship team
 Gary Woodland, professional golfer with 4 PGA Tour victories

References

External links
 Shawnee Heights High School
 Shawnee Heights District 450
 

Public high schools in Kansas
Schools in Shawnee County, Kansas